The Meritorious Team Commendation (MTC) is a unit award of the United States Coast Guard.  Created on 22 December 1993, the Meritorious Team Commendation is awarded for performance of exceptional actions that would normally warrant a Commandant's Letter of Commendation if recognizing an individual. Recognized groups must also display cohesion and teamwork noticeable to upper echelon commanders. The MTC is awarded to groups or teams that are not identifiable by OPFAC as a United States Coast Guard unit. The MTC may be awarded to military personnel, Coast Guard Auxiliarists, and civilians.

Appearance

For civilians there is a lapel pin that is awarded in lieu of a service ribbon. The pin is nickel plated with red and blue enameled surfaces referencing the pattern of the service ribbon.

Additional awards of the Meritorious Team Commendation are denoted by award stars with the award authorized to all Team Coast Guard units.  For those Coast Guard commands who are awarded the Meritorious Team Commendation under field operating conditions, the Operational Distinguishing Device is authorized.

References

Awards and decorations of the United States Coast Guard
Awards established in 1993